San Carlos or Villa San Carlos is a town in Mendoza Province, Argentina. It is the head town of San Carlos Department

Notable residents 
Alfredo Cornejo, governor of the province
Hugo Corro world Middleweight champion boxer

External links

 Municipal website

Populated places in Mendoza Province